The Men's 10 kilometre sprint biathlon competition at the 1988 Winter Olympics was held on 23 February, at Canmore Nordic Centre. Competitors raced over three loops of the skiing course, shooting two times, once prone and once standing. Each miss was penalized by requiring the competitor to race over a 150-metre penalty loop.

Results 

Frank-Peter Roetsch had led an East German sweep of the sprint podium at the 1987 Biathlon World Championships, and despite a penalty loop, won by more than 15 seconds over two clean shooting Soviet racers, 1986 sprint world champion Valeriy Medvedtsev and 21-year-old Sergei Tchepikov. Roetsch had also won the 20 kilometre event earlier in the week, ending up with both individual gold medals in Calgary.

References

Sprint